Joseph Leslie Bailey (2 October 1921 – 24 November 1996) was an Australian rules footballer who played with Geelong in the Victorian Football League (VFL).

Personal life
Bailey served as a corporal in the Australian Army during the Second World War.

Notes

External links 

1921 births
Geelong Football Club players
Newtown & Chilwell Football Club players
Australian Army personnel of World War II
1996 deaths
Australian Army soldiers
Australian rules footballers from Geelong